The Siberian flying squirrel (Pteromys volans) is an Old World flying squirrel ranging from the Baltic Sea in the west, throughout Northern Asia to the coast of the Pacific Ocean in the east. It is the only species of flying squirrel in Europe and is considered vulnerable in the European Union where it occurs only in Estonia and Finland. In Latvia, it was last sighted in 2001 and has been considered to be locally extinct since 2013.

Description
A female Siberian flying squirrel weighs about 150 grams, the males being slightly smaller on average.  The body is 13–20 cm long, with a 9–14 cm long flattened tail.  The eyes are large and strikingly black.  The coat is grey all over, the abdomen being slightly lighter than the back, with a black stripe between the neck and the forelimb.  A distinctive feature of flying squirrels is the furry glide membrane or patagium, a flap of skin that stretches between the front and rear legs.  By spreading this membrane the flying squirrel may glide from tree to tree across distances of over a hundred metres, and have been known to record a glide ratio of 3.31, but is normally 1-1.5.

Behaviour

Diet
Its diet consists of leaves, seeds, cones, buds, sprouts, nuts, berries and occasionally bird eggs and nestlings.  When alder and birch catkins are plentiful, the squirrel may store them for the winter in old woodpecker holes or similar nooks.

Reproduction
They mate early in the spring.  In southern Finland the first mating season begins in late March, with a second mating season occurring in April.  After a gestation period of five weeks, the female gives birth to a litter of usually two or three young, each weighing about 5 grams.  They preferentially build their nest in holes made by woodpeckers, but they may also nest in birdhouses if the size of the entrance is appropriate.  The nest consists of a pile of soft materials (preferably soft beard lichen) into which the squirrel burrows.  They can live up to about five years.

Habitat

They favour old forests with a mix of conifers and deciduous trees.  They are mostly nocturnal, being most active late in the evening, although females with young may also feed during the day.  They do not hibernate, but in the winter they may sometimes sleep continuously for several days.  As shy and nocturnal animals, they are seldom seen.  The most common sign of their presence is their droppings, which resemble orange-yellow rice grains and are often found beneath or on top of their nest.

Predators
The squirrels are preyed upon by martens, hawks, owls, dogs and cats.

In human culture
It is the emblem of Nuuksio National Park in Espoo municipality of Finland due to the density of the population in this region.

In Estonia, the Siberian flying squirrel is depicted on the logo of the Estonian Nature Fund.

Threats 

In Finland and especially the Baltic states, the Siberian flying squirrel has been at risk potentially becoming an endangered species. P. volans is already extirpated from Lithuania. Since 1996, it was also considered extinct in Belarus, until being spotted again in 2017, with more than 80 habitats subsequently discovered in far northern regions of the country in 2019. Acts that are believed to be contributors to the decrease in the population size are habitat fragmentation, climate, and habitat loss in places they reside like boreal forests and old-spruce-dominated forests. Because Finland is a member of the European Union, the squirrel is under the protection of the EU's 1992 Habitats Directive.  The EU, Finland and Estonia have responded with a six-year, 8.9 million euro project to help protect the squirrel.

References

External links 
 Pteromys volans at Animal Diversity Web.
 Images and text in Swedish about Pteromys volans.

Pteromys
Rodents of Asia
Rodents of Europe
Fauna of Siberia
Mammals described in 1758
Taxa named by Carl Linnaeus